Voltaic Regroupment Movement (French: Mouvement de Regroupement Voltaïque), was a political party in Upper Volta. It contested the 1970 elections.

References 
 Englebert, Pierre. La Revolution Burkinabè. Paris: L'Harmattan, 1986.

Defunct political parties in Burkina Faso